Paint Creek is a   tributary of the Kanawha River in southern West Virginia.

Paint Creek rises in north central Raleigh County and flows along County Route 7 north through Sweeneyburg and Maynor. At Maynor, the creek continues north along the West Virginia Turnpike. The creek follows the turnpike north into Fayette County, where it runs through the communities of Willis Branch, Pax, Long Branch, and Lively before curving to the northwest. Past Mossy and East Kingston, the creek briefly turns away from the highway before following it through Westerly, Milburn, Coalfield, Mahan, and Collinsdale. The creek then enters Kanawha County, where it heads north through Burnwell, Greencastle, and Whittaker. At Standard, Paint Creek Road turns away from the turnpike to follow County Route 83 (Paint Creek Road) north through Livingston and Gallagher. The creek flows north through Hollygrove before reaching its mouth at the Kanawha River in Hansford.

Paint Creek was named for the fact Indians blazed trees using natural paint.

See also
List of rivers of West Virginia
Paint Creek–Cabin Creek strike of 1912

References

External links
Paint Creek Scenic Trail

Rivers of West Virginia
Tributaries of the Kanawha River
Rivers of Raleigh County, West Virginia
Rivers of Fayette County, West Virginia
Rivers of Kanawha County, West Virginia